Redux a compilation album by Adam Ant. It is a 15-track bonus disc that only came with the Adam Ant Remastered limited edition collector's box set (5,000 copies) released 11 April 2005. It features previously unreleased demo versions of songs from his previous albums.

Along with Redux, Adam Ant Remastered came with remastered versions of Friend or Foe, Strip & Vive Le Rock, which also contained demos and outtakes from their respective albums. Most of the demos on Redux were from older Adam and the Ants albums, however, a few demos from his solo career appear on it as well.

The first four tracks are demos from 1980 for Adam and the Ants' breakthrough album, Kings of the Wild Frontier, recorded at KPM studio. "Prick Up Your Ears" (track one) is about 1960s English playwright and author Joe Orton and his mentor, lover and eventual murderer Kenneth Halliwell. By the time it became "The Magnificent Five," the lyrics became about Adam and the Ants.

Tracks five through eight are demos from 1981 from the Prince Charming, recording sessions at Windmill Lane Studios. Tracks nine through eleven are demos from Adam Ant's first solo album, Friend or Foe. "Seven Up" (track ten) is a previously unreleased instrumental. Tracks twelve through fourteen are Vive Le Rock demos. The final track is a cover of the title track to T. Rex's final album, "Dandy in the Underworld," recorded at John Reynolds' studio in Notting Hill.

Track listing
"Prick Up Your Ears" (Demo Version) [early version of "Magnificent Five"]
"Jolly Roger" (Demo Version)
"Making History" (Demo Version)
"Don't Be Square Be There" (Demo Version)
"Mowhok" (Demo Version)
"That Voodoo!" (Demo Version)
"Five Guns West" (Demo Version)
"Ups and Downs" (Demo Version) [early version of "Mile High Club"]
"Friend or Foe" (Demo Version)
"Seven Up" (Demo Version)
"Desperate But Not Serious/Manzanera" (Demo Version)
"Saigon" (Demo Version)
"Scorpio Rising" (Demo Version)
"Mohair Lockeroom Pin-Up Boys" (Demo Version)
"Dandy in the Underworld" (Demo from 1995)

References 

Adam Ant albums
2005 albums
Epic Records albums